Lone Rock is a solitary rock in Wahweap Bay in Lake Powell in Glen Canyon Recreation Area less than  from Glen Canyon Dam. It is located within Kane County, Utah, United States.

Facing Lone Rock is the Lone Rock Campground accessed from Route 89. The beach is one of the few places in Glen Canyon Recreation Area where people can drive right to the water's edge.

It was used as a filming location for the Doctor Who story "The Impossible Astronaut", the first episode of the sixth series, broadcast in April 2011 in the United Kingdom, the United States, Canada, and Australia.

References

External links 

 Lone Rock, Wahweap. Riverlakes Host
 Lone Rock. Aerial Photography

Landmarks in Utah
Landforms of Kane County, Utah
Rock formations of Utah